The 1974 Wisconsin–Whitewater Warhawks football team was an American football team that represented the University of Wisconsin–Whitewater as a member of the Wisconsin State University Conference (WSUC) during the 1974 NCAA Division III football season.

Schedule

References

Wisconsin-Whitewater
Wisconsin–Whitewater Warhawks football seasons
Wisconsin-Whitewater Warhawks football